Doc, Hands of Steel  (also known as  The Man Who Came to Kill and Man with the Golden Pistol) is a 1965 Spanish-Italian Spaghetti Western film directed by Alfonso Balcázar.

Cast 

 Carl Möhner: Doc MacGregor 
 Luis Dávila: Slade 
 Fernando Sancho: Pablo Reyes 
 Gloria Milland: Norma O'Connor  
 Umberto Raho: Brogas  
 Pedro Gil 
 Franco Balducci

References

External links

Doc, Hands of Steel at Variety Distribution

1965 films
Italian Western (genre) films
Spanish Western (genre) films
Spaghetti Western films
1965 Western (genre) films
Films directed by Alfonso Balcázar
Films scored by Angelo Francesco Lavagnino
1960s Italian films